Dickson Creek is a stream in Solano County, in the U.S. state of California.

References

Rivers of Solano County, California